Kotobi is a town in east-central Ivory Coast. It is a sub-prefecture of Arrah Department in Moronou Region, Lacs District.

Kotobi was a commune until March 2012, when it became one of 1126 communes nationwide that were abolished.

In 2014, the population of the sub-prefecture of Kotobi was 25,674.

Villages
The 4 villages of the sub-prefecture of Kotobi and their population in 2014 are:
 Abongoua (10 408)
 Kotobi (6 764)
 N'zanfouénou (5 617)
 Yaffo-Abongoua (2 885)

References

Sub-prefectures of Moronou Region
Former communes of Ivory Coast